Lynda Sutfin (born October 6, 1962) is an American athlete. She competed in the women's javelin throw at the 1984 Summer Olympics and the 1988 Summer Olympics.

References

External links
 

1962 births
Living people
Athletes (track and field) at the 1987 Pan American Games
Athletes (track and field) at the 1984 Summer Olympics
Athletes (track and field) at the 1988 Summer Olympics
American female javelin throwers
Olympic track and field athletes of the United States
Place of birth missing (living people)
Pan American Games track and field athletes for the United States
21st-century American women